Dawn DeBerry Stump is an American businesswoman and government official. She is the president of Stump Strategic, a consulting firm that she founded in 2016. Stump became a Commissioner of the Commodity Futures Trading Commission after being nominated by President Donald Trump and confirmed by the United States Senate.

Stump previously served as executive director of the Americas Advisory Board for the Futures Industry Association and as a vice president at NYSE Euronext. She has held various staff positions at both the United States Senate and United States House of Representatives, including a role with the United States Senate Committee on Agriculture, Nutrition and Forestry which oversees the CFTC.

References

External links
 Stump Strategic

Living people
Texas Tech University alumni
21st-century American businesswomen
21st-century American businesspeople
Trump administration personnel
Year of birth missing (living people)
Texas Republicans
Commodity Futures Trading Commission personnel